Jayant Shridhar Tilak (12 October 1921 – 23 April 2001), generally referred to as Jayant-rao Tilak, was a politician from Indian National Congress and was a member of the Parliament of India representing Maharashtra in the Rajya Sabha, the upper house of the Indian Parliament. He was also a Member of the Maharashtra Legislative Council. He was the chairman of the house for 16 years.

Early life and family
Jayantrao Tilak was a grandson of the Indian independence leader, Lokmanya Tilak. Jayantrao's father, Shridhar Balwant Tilak was a campaigner for social reforms in India. He worked with B.R. Ambedkar to eradicate untouchability in the 1920s. Dispute with family members and trustees of Kesari led Shridharpant to commit suicide in 1928.

His son, Deepak Tilak, is the Vice Chancellor of Tilak Maharashtra Vidyapeeth, a deemed University. Rohit Tilak, Deepak Tilak's son, was accused of rape in 2017. The case is pending in the court of law. Rohit Tilak contested 2009 assembly elections as a Congress candidate. Jayant Tilak's nephew Shailesh is associated with the Bharatiya Janata Party (BJP). Mukta Tilak, Shailesh Tilak's wife and Jayant Tilak's niece-in-law, was the first mayor from BJP in Pune Corporation in 2017. In 2019, Mukta Tilak was elected to Maharashtra assembly as a BJP candidate from Kasba Peth.

Death
Tilak died on 23 April 2001.

References

1921 births
2001 deaths
Indian National Congress politicians from Maharashtra
Rajya Sabha members from Maharashtra
Marathi politicians
Members of the Maharashtra Legislative Council
Politicians from Pune
Chairs of the Maharashtra Legislative Council
Maharashtra MLAs 1960–1962